Günther Seiffert (18 October 1937 – 11 November 2020) was a German racing driver. He made one attempt at a World Championship Formula One event, entering the 1962 German Grand Prix with a Lotus run by Wolfgang Seidel's team. The car was shared with Seidel himself, but they failed to qualify it.

Seiffert also participated in several non-Championship Formula One races during 1962–63, mostly for Seidel's team. He generally qualified at the back of the grid, and when he finished races, it was usually also at the back of the field. He drew attention to himself at the 1962 Lavant Cup when he collided with John Surtees while being lapped very early in the race, but his best showing was in his last Formula One event, where he finished seventh, albeit 12 laps down, at the 1963 Austrian Grand Prix.

After his racing career, Seiffert became a classic car dealer, also selling car accessories and slot car racing equipment.

Seiffert died on 11 November 2020, at the age of 83.

Complete Formula One World Championship results
(key)

Non-Championship

(key)

References

 "The Grand Prix Who's Who", Steve Small, 1995.
 "The Formula One Record Book", John Thompson, 1974.

1937 births
2020 deaths
German racing drivers
German Formula One drivers
Sportspeople from Oldenburg